Volutaxis is a genus of predatory air-breathing land snails, terrestrial pulmonate gastropod mollusks in the family Spiraxidae.

Distribution 
The distribution of the genus Volutaxis includes Mexico, Central America, and the Greater Antilles.

Species 
There are three subgenera in the genus Volutaxis. Species in the genus Volutaxis include:

Subgenus Volutaxis Strebel & Pfeffer, 1882
 Volutaxis blandiana (Pilsbry, 1909)
 Volutaxis cacahuamilpensis (Herrera, 1891)
 Volutaxis confertecostatus Strebel, 1882
 Volutaxis delicatus (Pilsbry, 1907)
 Volutaxis eburneus Thompson, 2010
 Volutaxis fallax (H. B. Baker, 1940)
 Volutaxis linearis (Pfeiffer, 1866)
 Volutaxis livingstonensis (Pilsbry, 1920)
 Volutaxis longior (Pilsbry, 1920)
 Volutaxis maya Bequaert & Clench, 1931
 Volutaxis nitidus Strebel, 1882
 Volutaxis rhoadsi (Pilsbry, 1899)
 Volutaxis scalariopsis (Morelet, 1851)
 Volutaxis scalella (Von Martens, 1898)
 Volutaxis strebeli (Pilsbry, 1907)
 Volutaxis subulinus (H. B. Baker, 1940)
 Volutaxis sulciferus (Morelet, 1851)
 Volutaxis tenuecostatus Strebel, 1882
 Volutaxis tenuis (Pfeiffer, 1868)
 Volutaxis uruapamensis (Pilsbry, 1899)

Subgenus Mirapex Baker, 1939 include one species:
 Volutaxis enigmaticus (H. B. Baker, 1939)

Subgenus Versutaxis Baker, 1939
 Volutaxis arctatus (H. B. Baker, 1940)
 Volutaxis futilis (H. B. Baker, 1939)
 Volutaxis opeas (H. B. Baker, 1939)
 Volutaxis odiosus (Pilsbry, 1899)
 Volutaxis patzcuarensis (Pilsbry, 1899)
 Volutaxis subgranum (H. B. Baker, 1939)
 Volutaxis subopeas (H. B. Baker, 1939)

Volutaxis (Mirapex ?) acus (Shuttleworth, 1852) is nomen dubium.

References 

Spiraxidae